The Daytime Emmy Award for Outstanding Single Camera Editing is an Emmy award given for editing in daytime television.

Winners and Nominees 
Winners in bold

Outstanding Achievement in Single Camera Editing

1990's 
1992
 Square One TV (PBS)
 This Old House (PBS)
 Reading Rainbow (PBS)
1993
 ABC Afterschool Special ("Shades of a Single Protein") (ABC)
 The Oprah Winfrey Show (SYN)
 CBS Schoolbreak Special ("Please God, I'm Only 17") (CBS)
 Reading Rainbow (PBS)
 ABC Afterschool Special ("Surviving a Break-Up") (ABC)
1994
 ABC Afterschool Special ("Girlfriend") (ABC)
 Dog City (FOX)
 Beakman’s World (CBS)
 The Addams Family (ABC)
 This Old House (PBS)
1995
 Beakman's World (CBS)
 Reading Rainbow (PBS)
 Bill Nye the Science Guy (SYN)
 This Old House (PBS)
 Dog City (FOX)
1996
 ABC Afterschool Special ("Positive: A Journey Into AIDS") (ABC)
 Beakman's World (CBS)
 This Old House (PBS)
 Reading Rainbow (PBS)
 Bill Nye the Science Guy (SYN)
1997
 Bill Nye the Science Guy (SYN)
 Beakman's World (CBS)
 Bob Vila's Home Again (SYN)
 This Old House (PBS)
 Reading Rainbow (PBS)
1998
 Bill Nye the Science Guy (SYN)
 Beakman's World (CBS)
 Reading Rainbow (PBS)
 This Old House (PBS)
 Wishbone (PBS)
1999
 Bill Nye the Science Guy (SYN)
 The Inventors’ Specials ("Edison: The Wizard of Light") (HBO)
 The New Yankee Workshop (PBS)
 Reading Rainbow (PBS)
 This Old House (PBS)

2000's 
2000
 The Artists’ Specials ("Mary Cassatt: American Impressionist") (HBO)
 Behind the Screen with John Burke (AMC)
 Bill Nye the Science Guy (SYN)
 Nick News with Linda Ellerbee (SYN)
 This Old House (PBS)
2001
 Between the Lions (PBS)
 Reading Rainbow (PBS)
 Natureworks (PBS)
 This Old House (PBS)
 Zoboomafoo (PBS)
2002
 V.I.P. (Syn)
 Reading Rainbow (PBS)
 Between the Lions (PBS)
 This Old House (PBS)
 Trading Spaces (TLC)
 ZOOM (PBS)
2003
 Reading Rainbow (PBS)
 A Wedding Story (TLC)
 Between the Lions (PBS)
 This Old House (PBS)
 While You Were Out (TLC)
2004
 Britney: In the Zone & Out All Night (MTV)
 Ask This Old House (PBS)
 Between the Lions (PBS)
 Dr. Phil (SYN)
 Great Hotels (Travel)
 ZOOM (PBS)
2005
 Reading Rainbow (PBS)
 Bob Vila's Home Again (SYN)
 Dr. Phil (SYN)
 The View (ABC)
 ZOOM (PBS)
2006
 Starting Over (SYN)
 Dr. Phil (SYN)
 Inside This Old House (A&E)
 The View (ABC)
2007
 Starting Over (SYN)
 This Old House (PBS)
 Sell This House (A&E)
 Between the Lions (PBS) 
 The View (ABC)
 Everyday Italian (Food Network)
2008
 DragonflyTV (PBS)
 FETCH! with Ruff Ruffman (PBS)
 Gourmet's Diary of a Foodie (PBS)
 Ur Life Online (A&E)
 Samantha Brown: Passport to Latin America (Travel)
2009
 Gourmet's Diary of a Foodie (PBS)
 Art Attack with Lee Sandstead (Travel)
 Biz Kid$ (PBS)
 DragonflyTV (PBS)
 Made in America (Travel)

2010's 
2010
 The Electric Company (PBS)
 The Relic Hunter with Ian Grant (Travel)
 Design Squad (PBS)
 Biz Kid$ (PBS)
2011
 The Electric Company (PBS)
 FETCH! with Ruff Ruffman (PBS)
 NASA 360 (NASA Television)
 SciGirls (PBS)
2012
 The Electric Company (PBS)
 Biz Kid$ (PBS)
 R.L. Stine's The Haunting Hour (Hub)
 Surf's Up For Dogs: The Making of the World's Longest and Heaviest Float (SYN)
2013
 Biz Kid$ (PBS)
 R.L. Stine's The Haunting Hour (Hub)
 SciGirls (PBS)
2014
 Giada in Paradise (Cooking Channel)
 Made in Israel (ABC Family)
 The Mind of a Chef (PBS)
 This Old House (PBS)
2015
 The Mind of a Chef (PBS)
 The Henry Ford’s Innovation Nation (CBS)
 Got Your 6 (MTV)
 Odd Squad (PBS)
2016 
 Giada in Italy (Food Network)
 Annedroids (Amazon)
 Ocean Mysteries with Jeff Corwin (SYN)
 R.L. Stine's Monsterville: Cabinet of Souls (Netflix)
 The Inspectors (CBS)
2017
 Eat the World with Emeril Lagasse (Amazon)
 The Henry Ford's Innovation Nation (CBS)
 The Mind of a Chef (PBS)
 Odd Squad (PBS)
 Weird But True! (Nat Geo)
2018 
 Giada In Italy (Food Network)
 1st Look (NBC)
 Cop and a Half: New Recruit (Netflix)
 Free Rein (Netflix)
 Scars of Nanking (A&E)

References 

Single Camera Editing